John Bradford (1887 – 1973) was a Scottish footballer who played as a goalkeeper, mainly for Morton and St Mirren.

Career
The first part of Bradford's senior career was spent with Morton, where he was an important member of the Greenock club's strong team in the era spanning World War I when they finished in the top four of the Scottish Football League table for six consecutive seasons, and won the War Fund Shield in 1915. However, he was called up for military service with the Highland Light Infantry and lost his place to the younger Dave Edwards in 1919 and spent time with Bo'ness (then playing in the Central League) before he was picked up by Morton's local rivals, St Mirren as a possible replacement for Willie O'Hagan.

He went on to have an equally successful time with the Paisley club, culminating in them winning the Scottish Cup for the first time in their history in 1926, Bradford lifting the trophy as captain. He left St Mirren abruptly in early 1927 after a dispute over absences, switching to Raith Rovers, and then had a spell with Dumbarton.

Bradford played in the Home Scots v Anglo-Scots annual trial match in 1912 and was selected for the Scottish Football League XI later the same year, but never gained a full international cap. He was inducted into St Mirren's 'Hall of Fame' in 2011, and was nominated for the Morton equivalent in 2017 though not added on that occasion.

See also
 List of footballers in Scotland by number of league appearances (500+)

References

1887 births
Date of birth missing
1973 deaths
Date of death missing
Scottish footballers
Sportspeople from Rutherglen
Sportspeople from Kirkintilloch
British Army personnel of World War I
Highland Light Infantry soldiers
Military personnel from South Lanarkshire
Association football goalkeepers
Greenock Morton F.C. players
Bo'ness F.C. players
Raith Rovers F.C. players
St Mirren F.C. players
Dumbarton F.C. players
Scottish Football League players
Scottish Junior Football Association players
Scottish Football League representative players